Pelle Helmer Petterson (born 31 July 1932) is a Swedish sailor and yacht designer. He is the son of Helmer Petterson and Norwegian-born Borgny Petterson (born Holm), and studied design at the leading Pratt Institute in New York from  1955 through 1957. His father was also a designer who developed wood gas aggregates and Volvo PV444, strongly influencing his son to go in his footsteps. He is probably best known for designing the Maxi brand of sailing boats, which are still among the most common sailing boats in Swedish waters. He also designed Volvo's successful sports car, the P1800, while he was a student of Pietro Frua.

There is a line of sailing clothing and sports wear bearing the name Petterson, under the Brand Name Pelle P. which are designed by his daughter, Cecilia. His other daughter, Ulrika "Icka", lives in the U.S. and is married to Paul Cayard, an American yachtsman and professional sailor.

Olympic medals and other yacht racing awards

Competing in the Star class, Petterson won two Olympic medals: a bronze in 1964 and a silver in 1972. He held the world title in this event in 1969.

He also won World Cup medals in the Soling Class and participated in the America's Cup several times, skippering the Swedish America's Cup Challenges in 1977 and 1980.

Awards
Petterson was the first person to be inducted into the Swedish Sailing Hall of Fame. On 14 May 2004 he received the Swedish Business Award for Outstanding Achievements of the first grade from the West Swedish Chamber of Commerce and Industry. Amongst previous recipients are Arvid Carlsson Nobel laureate, Ingvar Kamprad founder of Ikea and Pehr G. Gyllenhammar former CEO of Volvo.

On 19 November 2004 he received the KTH's Stora Pris from the Royal Institute of Technology in Stockholm.

On 8 June 2010 Petterson received from Carl XVI Gustaf of Sweden the King's Medal (12th size bright-blue ribbon) for outstanding contributions as a yachtsman and boat designer.

Achievements

See also
Maxi 77
Monark 540
Monark 606

References

External links
 pellepetterson.se

1932 births
Living people
Swedish male sailors (sport)
Olympic sailors of Sweden
Sailors at the 1964 Summer Olympics – Star
Sailors at the 1968 Summer Olympics – Dragon
Sailors at the 1968 Summer Olympics – Flying Dutchman
Sailors at the 1972 Summer Olympics – Star
Olympic silver medalists for Sweden
Olympic bronze medalists for Sweden
Swedish automobile designers
America's Cup yacht designers
Swedish yacht designers
Olympic medalists in sailing
Star class world champions
6 Metre class sailors
Volvo Ocean Race sailors
Medalists at the 1972 Summer Olympics
Medalists at the 1964 Summer Olympics
1980 America's Cup sailors
1977 America's Cup sailors
World champions in sailing for Sweden
Swedish people of Norwegian descent
Sportspeople from Stockholm